Charlotte Goldsmith (born 18 March 1979) is a road cyclist from the United Kingdom. She represented England at the 2006 Commonwealth Games. She also rode for Great Britain at the 2004 and 2005 UCI Road World Championships.

References

External links
 profile at Procyclingstats.com

1979 births
British female cyclists
Living people
Place of birth missing (living people)
Cyclists at the 2006 Commonwealth Games
Commonwealth Games competitors for England
21st-century British women